Drémil-Lafage is a commune in the Haute-Garonne department in southwestern France. It is located 13 km east from Toulouse.

Population
The inhabitants of the commune are known as Drémilois and Drémiloises in French.

See also
Communes of the Haute-Garonne department

References

Communes of Haute-Garonne